Alexander Forrester may refer to:

 Alexander Forrester of Garden 16th-century Scottish landowner
 Alexander Forrester (politician) (c1711–1787), British barrister and politician
 Alexander Forrester (educationist) (1805–1869) Presbyterian clergyman and educationist
 Alexander Forrester (minister) (1611–1686), Scottish minister

See also 
 Forrester (surname)